Aylin Yener holds the Roy and Lois Chope Chair in engineering at Ohio State University, and she is currently the President of the IEEE Information Theory Society. Dr. Yener is a Professor of Electrical and Computer Engineering, Professor of Integrated Systems Engineering, Professor of Computer Science and Engineering, Affiliated Faculty at the Sustainability Institute, and Affiliated Faculty at the Translational Data Analytics Institute, all at Ohio State University.

Education
Yener received her dual B.Sc degrees (1991) in Electrical and Electronics Engineering and Physics from Boğaziçi University, Istanbul, Turkey. She carried out her graduate career at Rutgers University, New Brunswick, NJ and received her M.S. in 1994 and Ph.D. in 2000 in Electrical and Computer Engineering while working in the Wireless Information Network Laboratory (WINLAB). 

In 2002, she joined Pennsylvania State University as an Electrical Engineer in University Park, Pennsylvania. She became a full professor by 2010 and was named a Fellow of the  Institute of Electrical and Electronics Engineers (IEEE) in 2015 for her contributions to wireless communication theory and wireless information security. Yener was named Dean's Fellow in 2017  and made the Clarivate Analytics Highly Cited Researchers list later the same year. Yener was honored as a Pennsylvania State University Distinguished Professor in 2019.

In 2020, Yener accepted a faculty position at Ohio State University becoming the Electrical Engineering Department's first chaired female professor.

Research interest
Yener is interested in fundamental performance limits of networked systems, communications and information theory. The applications of these fields include but not limited to information theoretic physical layer security, energy harvesting communication networks, and caching systems. 
She runs the INSPIRE Lab (Information and Networked Systems Powered by Innovation and Research in Engineering) at Ohio State University.

Awards

 IEEE Information Theory Society President (2020),
IEEE Information Theory Society Vice President (2019),
IEEE Guglielmo Marconi Best Paper Award (2014),
Defense Advanced Research Project Agency (DARPA) grant, "Rethinking Mobile Ad Hoc Networks: A Non-Equilibrium Information Theory" (2007).

References

Fellow Members of the IEEE
Living people
Year of birth missing (living people)

Ohio State University faculty
Boğaziçi University alumni
Rutgers University alumni
Pennsylvania State University faculty
Electrical engineers